Ixora brevipedunculata is a species of flowering plant in the family Rubiaceae. It is endemic to the island Tubuai in French Polynesia.

References

External links
World Checklist of Rubiaceae

brevipedunculata
Data deficient plants
Flora of the Tubuai Islands
Taxonomy articles created by Polbot